Muhammed Ghassan Aboud (born 1967) is a Dubai based Syrian entrepreneur, philanthropist and a founding member of the Syrian Business Council. He is mainly known as the founder of Ghassan Aboud Group, the UAE headquartered conglomerate. In 2018, Ghassan Aboud was named in the list of Top 50 Most Influential Expats in the UAE by Forbes Middle East.

Personal life 
Muhammed Ghassan Aboud was born on August 4, 1967 in the city of Idlib in northern Syria. He is married to Nahed Nebhan and has five children. He completed his Bachelors in Literature with a Major in Journalism from Damascus University, Syria.

Career 
He moved to the United Arab Emirates in October 1992 where he first worked in the public relations field before founding the Ghassan Aboud Group in the year 1994.

Ghassan Aboud Group commenced business as a small trader in new automobiles and spare parts. Over the years, he developed the business into a diversified conglomerate engaged in several economic sectors.

In 2018, Ghassan Aboud was named in the list of Top 50 Most Influential Expats in the UAE by Forbes Middle East.

Timeline 
 1994   : Ghassan Aboud’s first venture - Ghassan Aboud Cars & Spare Parts.
 2008   : Live Point Art Production established for art and TV production.
 2008   : Orient News set up to cater to Syrian diaspora in Arab world.  
 2016   : GA Group Australia was established as a specialized investment entity for the acquisition and development of hospitality assets. In-house hospitality brand Crystalbrook Collection set up as a GA Group entity in Australia.
 2017   : Grandiose Supermarket & Catering created.
 2017   : Gallega Global Logistics established.
 2019  : Purchased the Byron @ Byron Resort from Gerry Harvey for approximately  $42Million AUD.

Organizations

Ghassan Aboud Group 
The Ghassan Aboud Group (GAG) is an international conglomerate operating in industries such as automotive, logistics, media, hospitality, real estate, retail and also bespoke catering. Established in 1994 and headquartered in the United Arab Emirates for about 25 years, GAG’s business operations are complemented by offices in Australia, Belgium, China, Jordan and Turkey.

In October 2018, Ghassan Aboud Group was appointed as a distributor for export markets by HPCL Middle East FZCO, subsidiary of Indian public sector petroleum company, Hindustan Petroleum Corporation Limited (HPCL). Ghassan Aboud Group markets HPCL’s products like auto lubricants, industrial lubricants, asphalt, and solvents in the Middle East region.

It ranked 27th in the UAE's Top 50 Private Companies by Forbes Middle East in its December 2018 publication

In August 2021, the conglomerate launched BuyParts24, the region's largest online auto-parts marketplace. The marketplace signed significant partnerships with prominent market leaders including Al Habtoor Motors, Easa Saleh Al Gurg Group, Nasser Bin Abdullatif Alserkal, Bin Hamoodah Auto, AWR Rostamani and others.

Ghassan Aboud Cars & Spare Parts 
The automotive business was established in 1994 in Sharjah, United Arab Emirates. It started as a trading business dealing in vehicles, spare parts and accessories, the company now deals with passenger vehicles, commercial vehicles, heavy trucks and equipment, spare parts, lubricants & accessories and offers multi-country trade, with inbound and outbound logistics, storage, value addition, transportation, and documentation.

Over the past 25 years, Ghassan Aboud Cars & Spare Parts has grown into specialists in regional and international automotive supply chain solutions with a market reach of 100+ countries from its global hub in the UAE. It also has facilities in Khalifa Industrial Zone (KIZAD), Abu Dhabi and Dubai and additional hubs in Belgium and Jordan.

Currently, the auto business employs 350 staff across the various locations.

Crystalbrook Collection 
Ghassan Aboud established the Crystalbrook Collection, as an in-house hospitality management company in 2016 through acquisitions of hotel properties in Australia. Headquartered in Dubai, UAE, almost $600 million has been made to date for the acquisitions and development of hospitality assets in Australia. It has three 5 star hotel projects - Riley, a Crystalbrook Collection Resort, Bailey, a Crystalbrook Collection Hotel and Flynn, a Crystalbrook Collection Hotel scheduled for completion by 2019, along with Crystalbrook Lodge, Little Albion guest house in Sydney, Crystalbrook Superyacht Marina and a 90 foot vessel anchored in Port Douglas, Queensland named MV Bahama.

In 2018, he was named Leading International Hospitality Investor for his investments into Crystalbrook Collection, Australia.

In September 2022, the Crystalbrook Collection purchased the Rydges Sydney Harbour hotel for about $100m.

Live Point Art Production 
Established in 2008, Live Point Art produces news, socio-political, current events programs with a focus on the Arab region. They supply the programs to both foreign and Arabic channels. The programs include news reports, various broadcasts, studio and live window services along with entertainment programs like drama and film production, TV shows, dubbing, subtitling and distribution. Headquartered in Dubai - United Arab Emirates, it has branches in both Jordan and Istanbul.

Orient Media 
In 2008, he established Orient News, a satellite channel based out of UAE. Orient TV broadcasts news, current affairs and general entertainment programmes to the GCC, Levant, and parts of North Africa. Known for its objective coverage, the channel offers a mix of programs that include current affairs, news, culture, and entertainment.

Orient Radio is an Arabic radio-station broadcasting varied content; news, economic, sports, social shows, and Arabic music.

Orient Training Center was launched in 2018 as a specialized training center based in Dubai, Istanbul & Amman, providing short-term courses in media and production fields such as TV presenting, radio anchoring, journalism, documentary, directing etc. in a real T.V and production house environment.

Grandiose Supermarkets & Catering
Established in 2017, Grandiose is a retail brand with a chain of niche supermarkets and catering outlets in UAE. There are five outlets in Dubai and Abu Dubai with plans to open 20 more stores in the near future. Grandiose Catering is a specialized catering division providing catering solutions for retail, corporate and outdoor catering needs.

In December 2018, Grandiose Catering was awarded the “Catering Company of the Year” at the 2018 Leaders in F & B Awards held in Dubai.

Gallega Global Logistics
Established in 2017, Gallega Global Logistics provides End-to-End logistics solutions to 3PL customers in the UAE and the region. In May 2018,a 275,000 square metres logistics facility was established in Khalifa Industrial Zone Abu Dhabi (KIZAD), Abu Dhabi to cater as a full-scale automotive logistics facility with vehicle storage yard, warehouses, workshops, offices, body shop and  PDI facility.

Pastoral Business
Ghassan Aboud Group has invested in the pastoral business in Australia with land holding of 35,000 hectares with a carrying capacity of 2,500 breeders. The milk and meat produced will be supplied to customers and also for GAG’s hospitality business.

Awards and honors

Philanthropy 
Ghassan Aboud established Orient for Human Relief in 2012 to provide medical, educational, and social services to the millions of Syrians that have been displaced or injured in the Syrian conflict. The organization receives doctors from international organizations such as the Syrian American Medical Society, USAID, and Hand in Hand International from the United Kingdom.

In 2015, he received the Global Gift Foundation’s Philanthropreneur Award in recognition of his humanitarian work.

References

1967 births
Living people
Damascus University
Syrian journalists
Businesspeople in mass media
Syrian expatriates in the United Arab Emirates
Syrian billionaires
Syrian businesspeople